James Dawe (1844 – 6 August 1919) was a New Zealand cricketer who played for Canterbury.

Dawe made a single first-class appearance for the side, during the 1873–74 season, against Otago. From the opening order, he scored a duck in the first innings in which he batted, and, when moved down the order in the second innings, scored two runs.

References

External links
James Dawe at Cricket Archive 

1844 births
1919 deaths
New Zealand cricketers
Canterbury cricketers